The King's Prisoner (Italian: Il prigioniero del re) is a 1954 Italian historical adventure film directred by Giorgio Venturini and starring Pierre Cressoy, Andrée Debar and Armando Francioli. It is based on the novel The Man in the Iron Mask by Alexandre Dumas.

The film's sets and costumes were designed by the art director Giancarlo Bartolini Salimbeni. It was shot in Ferraniacolor and earned around 269 million lira at the box office.

Cast
 Pierre Cressoy as Henri/Louis XIV
 Andrée Debar as Elisabeth de Moreuil
 Armando Francioli as Roland
 Xenia Valderi as Rosa
 Luigi Tosi as Carcan
 Marcello Giorda as La Rabaudière
 Nerio Bernardi as Saint-Maur
 Olga Solbelli as Regina Anna d'Austria
 Adolfo Geri as La Tallier
 Sergio Bergonzelli	
 Miranda Campa

References

Bibliography
 Chiti, Roberto & Poppi, Roberto. Dizionario del cinema italiano: Dal 1945 al 1959. Gremese Editore, 1991.
 Goble, Alan. The Complete Index to Literary Sources in Film. Walter de Gruyter, 1999.
 Klossner, Michael. The Europe of 1500-1815 on Film and Television: A Worldwide Filmography of Over 2550 Works, 1895 Through 2000. McFarland & Company, 2002.

External links

1954 films
Films directed by Giorgio Venturini
1950s Italian-language films
Italian historical adventure films
1950s historical adventure films
Films set in the 17th century
1954 adventure films
Films based on The Vicomte of Bragelonne: Ten Years Later
1950s Italian films